San Juan de Lurigancho (SJL) is a district in Lima, Peru, located in the area known as Cono Este.  
It is Peru's most populous district, with a current population that may exceed one million.

On the north, it is bordered by the districts of Carabayllo and  Huarochirí Province. San Juan de Lurigancho is bordered by Comas, Independencia and Rímac on the west; and Lurigancho on the east. The Rímac River marks the district's border with downtown Lima and El Agustino on the south.

The most important urban areas in the district are Mangomarca, Zárate, Las Flores de Lima, Canto Grande and Bayovar. One of the first urban areas in San Juan de Lurigancho is Caja de Agua, which is located at the entrance of the district, and the northern entrance to the district is the Quebrada Canto Grande y Media Luna. Caja de Agua is surrounded by San Cristobal (south side) and the Santa Rosa hills from south to west and by Gramal hill on the north side. The Próceres de la Independencia Avenue separates Caja de Agua from Zárate. Caja de Agua is the seat of the Police Station located in Avenida Lima. A large and convenient market is found in Avenida Lima; "Mercado Modelo de Caja de Agua" which offers value for money products. Another market is "El Bosque". Also, Caja de Agua contains 3 local state schools which are in a very poor conditions, on the brink of being abandoned and closed due to the lack of students; these are "Javier Heraud"; jirón Arequipa. "Cesar Vallejo'; jirón Amazonas and "Tomas Alva Edison"; which is located next to the market "El Bosque".

Climate

The summers tend to be rather dry. Summer is from October to April. May to September is a cold season.  It seldom rains in this area, though the proximity to the coast brings cold humidity and fog in the winter.

Demographics
As of the 2017 census, the district San Juan de Lurigancho has a population of approximately 1,038,495, the largest of Lima in terms of population.

Transportation
San Juan de Lurigancho is serviced by many bus routes that connect it with almost all the other districts in Lima.

The main route that connects San Juan de Lurigancho with the rest of the Lima and Callao Metropolitan Area is the Próceres de la Independencia Avenue, Consisting of 74 blocks. The Puente Nuevo, or New Bridge (actually a combination of two bridges with traffic going in opposite directions), inaugurated in 1993, provided a long-needed direct link to El Agustino and points south and east. Finally, the Lima Metro connects the district with the rest of Lima.

Another important transportation link, a tunnel that will connect the districts of San Juan de Lurigancho with Rimac, has been halted. This tunnel is called Santa Rosa and San Martin, and was built up to 60% of its length but perforation of the tunnel was stopped due to some faults in the hill that was being excavated in March 2012. As of January 2014, construction has not resumed.

Other

See also 
 Administrative divisions of Peru

References

External links
 Municipalidad de San Juan de Lurigancho - San Juan de Lurigancho district council official website. 
  1.60 Gigapixel San Juan de Lurigancho

Districts of Lima